The  Eastern Turks may refer to the following polities and their people:
 Eastern Turkic Khaganate
 Second Eastern Turkic Khaganate

Disambiguation pages